Oteapan is a Municipality in Veracruz, Mexico. It is in south-east zone of the State of Veracruz, about 394  km from state capital Xalapa. It has an area of 27.97 km2.

The municipality of Oteapan is delimited to the north by Chinameca to the east by Cosoleacaque, to the south by Zaragoza and to the south-west by Jaltipan State.

It produces principally maize, rice and green chile.

In Oteapan, in May takes place the celebration in honor to Santa Cecilia, patron of the town.

The weather in  Oteapan is warm all year with rains in summer and autumn.

References

External links 

  Municipal Official webpage
  Municipal Official Information

Municipalities of Veracruz